The Party of Civic Rights (SPO) leadership election of March 2010 was held on 6 March 2010. Miloš Zeman became party's first leader.

Background
Party of Civic Rights was founded in October 2009 by association of Miloš Zeman's friends. Miloš Zeman was expected to become party's leader. Zeman himself didn't confirm these speculations. Party's founders confirmed that Zeman is expected to become the new leader.

Result

Voting was held on 6 March 2010. Zeman was the only candidate. He received 245 votes of 269 and was elected.

References

Party of Civic Rights leadership elections
2010
2010 elections in the Czech Republic
Indirect elections
Party of Civic Rights leadership election